Compartmentalization or compartmentalisation may refer to:

 Compartmentalization (biology)
 Compartmentalization (engineering)
 Compartmentalization (fire protection)
 Compartmentalization (information security)
 Compartmentalization (psychology)
 Compartmentalization of decay in trees